Swallows is an extinct town in Pueblo County, in the U.S. state of Colorado. The GNIS classifies it as a populated place.

A post office called Swallows was established in 1892, and remained in operation until 1947. The community was named for the swallows which nested near the original town site.

References

Ghost towns in Colorado
Geography of Pueblo County, Colorado